The Hampton Roads Bridge–Tunnel (HRBT) is a -long Hampton Roads crossing for Interstate 64 and U.S. Route 60. It is a four-lane facility comprising bridges, trestles, man-made islands, and tunnels under the main shipping channels for Hampton Roads harbor in the southeastern portion of Virginia in the United States.

It connects the historic Phoebus area of the independent city of Hampton near Fort Monroe on the Virginia Peninsula with Willoughby Spit in the city of Norfolk in South Hampton Roads, and is part of the Hampton Roads Beltway.

History and design

Prior to the opening of the HRBT (and well before even the HRBT's counterpart the Monitor–Merrimac Memorial Bridge–Tunnel), VDOT operated ferries to carry vehicle traffic across the harbor from the Southside to the Peninsula. There were two routes: one from Hampton Boulevard near Naval Station Norfolk to downtown Newport News, and a second, less popular route from Willoughby Spit to Fort Monroe in Hampton. Traffic at the time was typically about 2500 vehicles per day. The original two-lane structure opened November 1, 1957 at a cost of $44 million as a toll facility.  As population and traffic grew, construction on a parallel bridge-tunnel facility began in 1972. The construction of the $95 million second portion of the HRBT was funded as part of the Interstate Highway System as authorized under the Federal-Aid Highway Act of 1956, as a portion of I-64, which means that it was funded with 90% FHWA funds from the Highway Trust Fund and 10% state DOT funds. The second span opened on November 1, 1976 as a toll-free roadway.

Design 
The HRBT has two -wide lanes each way, on separately built bridge–tunnel structures.  The bridge–tunnel was originally signed as State Route 168 and U.S. Route 60. It later received the Interstate 64 designation when the second span opened in 1976, and, much later, SR 168 was truncated south of the crossing. The centerline of the HRBT tunnels cross a naturally deep channel ranging from 50 to 60 feet deep, 1-1/2 mile wide, with water only 6–10 feet deep between the edge of the deep channel and each shore.

Part of the design features of the HRBT involved the use of man-made islands for the tunnel portals at the place where Hampton Roads flows into the Chesapeake Bay. Fort Wool is on a man-made island known as Rip Raps, created in 1818. There is a small earthen causeway that connects Fort Wool to the HRBT south portal island including the island across the navigational channel of the mouth of Hampton Roads from Old Point Comfort was created for Fort Calhoun (a portion of the Fort Monroe complex later renamed Fort Wool).

Modern day 

Given its proximity to the U.S. Navy's Atlantic Fleet home base at Naval Station Norfolk, many nearby shipyards and critical port facilities, the HRBT design incorporates a tunnel instead of a more cost effective drawbridge. A bridge–tunnel, if destroyed in wartime or due to natural disaster, would not block the vital shipping channels.

Another four-lane facility, the Monitor–Merrimac Memorial Bridge–Tunnel (MMMBT) was completed in 1992. The MMMBT provided a second bridge–tunnel crossing of the Hampton Roads harbor, supplementing the Hampton Roads Bridge–Tunnel and providing some traffic relief. The MMMBT also forms part of the Hampton Roads Beltway, and is also toll-free.

Over-height vehicles 

Because of this, special over-height detectors have been installed near the Willoughby Spit end of the bridge alerting the truck driver to stop at the inspection station for a more precise measurement of the trucks height. If a truck driver ignores this alert or for whatever reason doesn't stop at the inspection station, VDOT personnel at the tunnel will be alerted and the truck will be alerted and flagged to stop prior to the entrance to the tunnel, where with a fine of up to $2,500 may be assessed if the over height occurs during rush hour. This is because any vehicle turnaround at the tunnel requires a full-stoppage of traffic in both directions in order to redirect the affected vehicle from one side of the bridge-tunnel to the other. VDOT currently has identified new systems to improve the overheight detection system, by detecting vehicles well in advance of the tunnel to cut down on the over heights approaching the tunnel, This project is estimated to cost the state $900,000.

July 2009 flood
In July 2009, the westbound tube partially flooded after a thunderstorm hit the Hampton Roads region. The flooding was caused by a failed water main, which burst and led a chamber below the tunnel roadway to fill with millions of gallons of water. Pumps designed to remove water from the chamber were overwhelmed, and water began to puddle on the roadway, forcing VDOT to close the tunnel for nearly seven hours during midday on July 2, 2009.

This closure forced hundreds of thousands of commuters, tourists, as well as Hampton Roads residents heading westbound for the Fourth of July holiday, to divert and go through the MMMBT or the James River Bridge, the only alternate routes to get to the Peninsula.  The MMMBT had troubles of its own during the afternoon, as a pileup shut down the northbound lanes, closing the tunnel and causing a  traffic jam along I-664.  The James River Bridge was also closed on July 2 because of downed wires from the storm.  The series of events involving all three water crossings led to a "perfect storm" of traffic which led to gridlock throughout all major arteries of Hampton Roads.

The flooding of the Hampton Roads Bridge–Tunnel caused widespread concern about evacuation capabilities of the region during the approach of a hurricane, as the HRBT, MMMBT and the James River Bridge serve as the primary hurricane evacuation routes for residents of Virginia Beach, Portsmouth, Norfolk, and Chesapeake.

July 2016 vehicle crash and fire 
At 7:30 pm on July 16, 2016, a two-car collision between a Volkswagen Passat and an Acura occurred three-quarters of the way inside the eastbound tunnel, which travels from Hampton to Norfolk. The Acura was rear-ended by the Passat; both vehicles burst into flames and filled the tunnel with smoke, leaving 35 vehicles stuck inside the tunnel behind the scene. Because neither of the tunnels have escape walkways, 80 drivers and passengers were required to walk out of the tunnel through the smoke, leaving their vehicles behind. Fifteen people were treated on the scene for smoke inhalation, while four others were taken to the hospital. The fires caused moderate to major damage to the walls of the tunnel, which VDOT repaired through nightly road work at the tunnel.

The crash shut down traffic in both directions for four hours, finally reopening westbound at 11 pm, and reopening eastbound at 11:45 pm.  The driver of the Passat was cited with following too closely by Virginia State Police.

Expansion plans
According to VDOT, in 1958, an average of 6,000 vehicles a day used the facility whereas an average of 88,000 vehicles a day were using the crossing in 2008, with volumes exceeding 100,000 during the tourist season, well exceeding the original design capacity of 77,000 vehicles per day, which sparked decades of debate on how to improve traffic flow at the region's most important water crossing. Studies into the growing traffic at the HRBT have roots back to the early 1990s. In 1992, the Virginia General Assembly had requested that VDOT study growing traffic at the HRBT. The conclusion of that study determined that a long-term large-scale solution to the problem would be required to alleviate backups. For the next fourteen years, VDOT would undertake numerous studies in 1999, 2008, 2012 and 2016, to help choose a candidate build that was financially and physically feasible to build.

After nearly two decades of studies and planning, the Commonwealth Transportation Board, and the two regional boards responsible for the project (HRTPO/HRTAC) voted unanimously in 2016 to a $3.3 billion expansion of the current bridge-tunnel and its approaches from four lanes to four lanes in both directions from the I-664 interchange to the I-564 interchange, with two new, two lane bridge tunnels built to carry traffic eastbound (Hampton to Norfolk). A Final Environmental Impact Study was published in May 2017, and the Record of Decision from the FHWA was granted in June. On October 29, 2020 a groundbreaking ceremony was held in Hampton for the project. It is expected to be completed by November 2025.

See also
 
 
 
 List of bridges
 Lists of tunnels
 List of bridge–tunnels

References

External links

 Roads to the Future website
 Hampton Roads Bridge–Tunnel on Google Maps
 Kurumi's website about 3 digit interstates connecting with I-64
 Virginia Department of Transportation: Hampton Roads Tunnels and Bridges

Bridge–tunnels in North America
Bridges completed in 1957
Intracoastal Waterway
Transportation in Norfolk, Virginia
Road tunnels in Virginia
U.S. Route 60
Buildings and structures in Norfolk, Virginia
Buildings and structures in Hampton, Virginia
Former toll bridges in Virginia
Former toll tunnels in the United States
Transportation in Hampton, Virginia
Tunnels completed in 1957
Tunnels completed in 1976
Road bridges in Virginia
Interstate 64
Bridges on the Interstate Highway System
Bridges of the United States Numbered Highway System
Former toll roads in Virginia
Cross-sea traffic ways in North America
Immersed tube tunnels in the United States
Crossings of the James River (Virginia)
Trestle bridges in the United States